The Book of Shabazz (Hidden Scrollz) is the debut studio album by Wu-Tang Clan affiliated rapper Shabazz the Disciple who was a member of Sunz Of Man.

Track listing
 "The Opening (Intro)"
 "Righteous Chamber (skit)"
 "Red Hook Day"
 "1st Annual Bootleg Awards (skit)"
 "Hip Pop"
 "Oasis"
 "Surrender (Thieves in Da Nite Pt. 2)"
 "B.K.B.S. (Brooklyn Bullshit)"
 "Son Rise"
 "Cremate 'Em"
 "Crime Saga"
 "Passover (skit)"
 "Street Parables" (featuring Lord Jamar)
 "Thieves in Da Nite (Heist)" (featuring Killah Priest and Lil' Dap)
 "Organized Rime Pt. 2"
 "Blasphemy"
 "Ghetto Apostles" (featuring R.H. Bless, Freestyle & Poetic)
 "The Lamb's Blood"
 "War Trilogy: P.O.W." (featuring Freestyle)
 "War Trilogy: M.I.A."
 "War Trilogy: Ambush" (featuring Freestyle)

Shabazz the Disciple albums
2003 debut albums